The Bravo 700 is a small, two-seat civil utility aircraft manufactured by Aero Bravo in Brazil in both kit and ready-to-fly form. It is a high-wing monoplane of metal construction with fixed tricycle undercarriage and is classed as an ultralight under Brazilian aviation regulations. An agricultural version, the Bravo 700 Agrícola with spraying gear and a chemical tank with a capacity of 140 L (37 US gal) has been developed to flight-testing stage.

Zenith Aircraft considers the Aero Bravo design an unauthorized copy of the Zenith STOL CH 701.

Specifications (Bravo 700)

References

700
High-wing aircraft
Single-engined tractor aircraft
1990s Brazilian civil utility aircraft